Freeman is the eponymous debut and only studio album by American rock band Freeman.

Background
Aaron Freeman left Ween in May 2012. He played shows both solo and accompanied by Joe Young from 2012-2014. After moving to Woodstock, New York and teaching at Paul Green's School of Rock, Freeman began working on material for a new album. He assembled musicians from the Brooklyn, New York area as well as North Carolina to record the album for Partisan Records. The new band, "Freeman" hit the road in July 2014 in support of the album. The live version of Freeman featured Joe Young on bass and Zach Tenorio-Miller on keyboards, along with Chris Boerner and Kyle Keegan, who played on the album. Freeman was produced by Chris Shaw who had previously produced Ween's White Pepper album.

Reception

Freeman received generally favorable reviews from critics. AllMusic's Stephen Thomas Erlewine wrote, "If anything, Freeman is a tighter record than McCartney -- it's not homemade, it's all complete songs -- but there's no denying it shares the same spirit; that it is the sound of breaking dawn of a new day."

Track listing

Personnel
 Aaron Freeman - composer, electric guitar, acoustic guitar, vocals, synthesizer, primary artist
 Dave Godowsky - co-composer (tracks 2 & 3), acoustic guitar, organ, piano, vocals
 Chris Boerner - electric guitar
 Brad Cook - bass
 Kyle Keegan - percussion
 Chris Shaw - producer, engineer
 Marco Benevento - organ, piano, Wurlitzer
 Tracy Bonham - vocals, violin
The Black Bush Boys - percussion
 Greg Calbi - mastering
 Paul Q. Kolderie - mixing
 Nick LaVecchia - cover photo
 Zeynep Sankaynagi - drawing

References

Freeman (band) albums
2014 debut albums